CPG Corporation is an infrastructure, building management, and consultancy services company in the Asia Pacific.

CPG Corporation is part of the former Public Works Department of Singapore; the company provides architecture and engineering consultancy to project and construction management. It is headquartered in Singapore, with 12 overseas offices in China, India, Vietnam, the Philippines and the UAE.

History
The Public Works and Convicts Department was formed in 1833 after George Drumgoole Coleman became the first superintendent. The department was formally established as the Public Works Department of Singapore (PWD) in 1946.

Under Temasek Holdings, it was incorporated in 1999 and renamed to PWD Corporation before again being renamed to CPG Corporation in 2002. A year later, it became part of the Downer EDI Group.

In 2012, the ownership of the CPG Corporation group of companies was transferred from Downer EDI, Australia, to China Architecture Design and Research Group.

List of CPG projects in Singapore
Ayer Rajah Expressway, Singapore
Benjamin Sheares Bridge, Singapore
Bukit Timah Expressway, Singapore
Cavenagh Bridge, Singapore
Central Expressway, Singapore
Central Fire Station, Singapore
Changi Airport, Terminal 1, 2, 3, Singapore
Changi Water Reclamation Plant, Singapore
Chek Jawa Visitor Centre, Singapore
Duke-NUS Graduate Medical School, Singapore
East Coast Lagoon Food Village, Singapore
Esplanade Theatres on the Bay, Singapore
Gardens by the Bay, Singapore
INTERPOL Global Complex for Innovation, Singapore
Khoo Teck Puat Hospital, Singapore
Kranji Expressway, Singapore
Lorong Halus Wetland, Singapore
Malay Heritage Centre, Singapore
Mandai Crematorium and Columbarium, Singapore
Marina Coastal Expressway, Singapore
Nanyang Technological University The Hive, Singapore
National Centre for Infectious Diseases and Centre for Healthcare Innovation, Singapore
National Gallery Singapore, Singapore
National Museum of Singapore, Singapore
Ng Teng Fong General Hospital and Jurong Community Hospital, Singapore
NTU School of Art, Design and Media, Singapore
NUS Tahir Foundation Building, Singapore
Old Hill Street Police Station, Singapore
Pan Island Expressway, Singapore
Pasir Ris Sports and Recreation Centre, Singapore
Raffles Institution, Singapore
Singapore Botanic Gardens, Singapore
Singapore Parliament House, Singapore
Singapore Racecourse, Singapore
Solaris @ one-north, Singapore
State Courts Towers, Singapore
Sungei Buloh Wetland Reserve, Singapore
Treasure Island Bungalows, Singapore
Tan Tock Seng Hospital, Singapore
The Rochester, Singapore
Victoria School, Singapore
Woodlands Checkpoint, Singapore

List of CPG projects overseas
ADB Headquarters, Philippines
Amity International School, UAE
Cam Ranh Airport International Terminal, Vietnam
Da Nang International Airport, Vietnam
Eco Botanic, Malaysia
Eco Summer, Malaysia
Eco Terraces, Malaysia
Emirates Financial Towers, Dubai, UAE
GEMS World Academy, Dubai, UAE
Hazrat Shahjalal International Airport, Bangladesh
Indus Academic Medical Campus, Pakistan
Islamabad International Airport, Islamabad, Pakistan
Khartoum International Airport, Sudan
Kunshan Western District Medical Centre, China
National Diagnostic Centre, Maldives
Setia Sky 88, Malaysia
Seychelles International Airport, Seychelles
Sheraton Hotel and Condominium, Shunde, China
Sky 8 Condominium, Malaysia
Tianjin Baoding Bridge, China
Xiamen Zhongshan Park Station, China

References

External links
Official website

Construction and civil engineering companies established in 1946
Companies of Singapore
1946 establishments in Singapore
Singaporean brands